Sir Geoffrey de Valognes (died 1190), also known as Geoffrey de Valoines, lord of the manors  of Burton, Sutton, Great Saling, Sline, Farleton and Cantsfield was an Anglo-French who served as  Sheriff of Lancashire between 1164-1166.

Career
He was a son of Roger de Valognes by his wife Agnes RitzRichard, a daughter of John FitzRichard. In 1163 he married Emma de Bulmer, daughter of Bertram de Bulmer of Brancepeth Castle by his wife Emma Fossard.

Death and succession
He died in 1190 without surviving issue. His heir was identified as his niece Gunnora de Valognes, daughter of his brother Robert de Valognes.

Citations

References

Year of birth unknown
1190 deaths
Anglo-Normans
High Sheriffs of Lancashire
People from Benington, Hertfordshire
Geoffrey